Marsac is a commune in the Creuse department in the Nouvelle-Aquitaine region in central France.

Geography
The commune is served by a TER railway.

Population

Sights
 The church of St. Pierre, dating from the thirteenth century.
 The ruins of a fifteenth-century castle.
 Two dolmens.
 Three old public washhouses.
 The chapel des Rorgues

See also

Communes of the Creuse department

References

Communes of Creuse
County of La Marche